Wardat is a 1981 Hindi-language spy thriller film. The film is the sequel to Surakshaa. Large locusts attack the farmers and farmlands resulting in hefty damages.

Plot
The Indian Government suspects that this is the work of some terrorists and assign this case to their best agent Gunmaster G-9 alias Gopinath, who takes charge and begins the investigation, that will lead him to the dark secret world of underground scientists who are quite capable of harnessing nature to make their ends meet.

Cast
Mithun Chakraborty as Gunmaster G-9 / Gopinath  
Kaajal Kiran as Kajal Malhotra  
Iftekhar as Chief  
Shakti Kapoor as Shakti Kapoor  
Kalpana Iyer as Anuradha  
Jagdeep as Kabadi  
Keshto Mukherjee as Dharamdas  
Birbal

Soundtrack
The songs of the film are being composed by Bappi Lahiri, written by Ramesh Pant and Faruk Kaiser and the singers were Mohammed Rafi, Usha Mangeshkar, Bappi Lahiri, Usha Uthup, Annette Pinto, and Shailendra Singh.

References

External links

Wardat on The A.V. Club
Wardat on TV Guide

1980s spy thriller films
1980s Hindi-language films
Indian sequel films
Films scored by Bappi Lahiri
Indian spy thriller films
Films directed by Ravikant Nagaich